General elections were held in Kuwait on 5 December 2020. Two-thirds of the incumbents lost their seats, including the 2016 parliament's sole woman MP Safa Al Hashem.

Background
Registration of candidates contesting for the 50 seats of the National Assembly took place between 26 October and 4 November 2020. 102 schools were used for the 2020 National Assembly elections on December 5. Each school had a clinic set up to check on the health condition of all those entering.

Electoral system
The 50 elected members of the National Assembly are elected from five 10-seat constituencies by single non-transferable vote. Political parties are not officially licensed, therefore candidates run as individuals, although many political groups operate freely as de facto political parties. All Kuwaiti citizens (both male and female) above the age of 21 have the right to vote. Expatriate workers, who constituted 70% of the population, were not enfranchised.

Results
Overall, opposition candidates won 24 seats, up from 16 in the previous parliament. The election was seen as a victory for the anti-government opposition bloc. Thirty of the elected candidates were under the age of 45; whilst there were 29 female candidates, none were elected, leaving the parliament without a female MP for the first time since the year 2012. There was a total of 567,694 registered voters, of which 394,131 cast a valid vote.

Aftermath
Following the elections, a new Speaker of the National Assembly was elected on 15 December. Incumbent Speaker Marzouq Al-Ghanim was re-elected with 33 votes, defeating Bader Nasser Al-Humaidi, who received 28. Four members did not vote.

Parliament unanimously approved a motion of noncooperation, meaning the cabinet must be replaced.

References

Kuwait
General election
December 2020 events in Asia
Elections in Kuwait
Non-partisan elections